Allahmədətli (also, Allahmədədli and Alakhmadatli) is a village and municipality in the Imishli Rayon of Azerbaijan.  It has a population of 383.

References 

Populated places in Imishli District